Grammothele brasilensis is a poroid crust fungus in the family Polyporaceae. Found in Brazil, it was described as new to science in 2015 by Norwegian mycologist Leif Ryvarden.

References

brasilensis
Fungi described in 2015
Fungi of Brazil
Taxa named by Leif Ryvarden